Multai railway station is a railway station in Multai town of Madhya Pradesh. Its code is MTY. It serves Multai town. The station consists of three platforms. Passenger, Express and Superfast trains halt here.

References

Railway stations in Betul district
Nagpur CR railway division